Doug's 1st Movie is a 1999 American animated comedy film based on the Disney-produced episodes of the animated television series Doug. The film was directed by Maurice Joyce, and stars the regular television cast of Tom McHugh, Fred Newman, Chris Phillips, Constance Shulman, Frank Welker, Alice Playten, Guy Hadley, and Doris Belack. It was produced by Walt Disney Television Animation and Jumbo Pictures with animation provided by Plus One Animation, and released by Buena Vista Pictures on March 26, 1999.

A Mickey Mouse Works short "Donald's Dynamite: Opera Box", was released with it.

The film received mixed to negative reviews, who criticized its plot, writing, and character development. However, the voice acting, ending and animation were praised. Despite the title and its success at the box office, no further films based on Doug were made.

Plot
BluffCo has been dumping waste into Lucky Duck Lake under the command of CEO Bill Bluff. This pollution creates a friendly creature that is discovered by Doug Funnie and Skeeter Valentine. They house the creature in Doug's home, where they name him Herman, after he tries to eat a copy of Moby-Dick by Herman Melville. Not wanting him to be discovered, they disguise him as a foreign exchange student called Hermione, causing Doug's love interest Patti Mayonnaise to become jealous from all the attention he gives her, leading school paper reporter Guy Graham to make a move on her. Meanwhile, bully Roger Klotz and his cronies build a robot to kidnap Herman, but instead it becomes very overbearing toward Roger.

Doug and Skeeter show Herman to Doug's neighbor, Mayor Tippy Dink, who warns them Bluff will kill the story if they try to get it into the press. After being mocked by Guy in front of Patti, Doug calls a press announcement where he promises to expose what Bluff is doing to the lake. While initially dismissive, Guy finds a picture of Herman and realizes Doug is telling the truth. He notifies Bluff, who sends BluffCo agents to Doug's announcement posing as reporters to capture Herman. Doug sees through the ruse and calls off the conference, but Herman is kidnapped and Patti now believes Doug to be a liar.

The next day, in the school newspaper office, Doug finds an article by Guy detailing how Herman attacked students at the upcoming Valentine's Day dance and was killed by BluffCo agents. Realizing Guy and Bluff's plan, Doug and Skeeter recruit Roger and Al and Moo Sleech to help thwart it. On the night of the dance Doug has to give up his last chance to win Patti back in order to save Herman. The Sleech's reprogram Roger's robot to act like the monster in Guy's article, distracting everyone while Doug and Skeeter find Herman and sneak him out of the school in a giant Valentine's decoration.

They bring Herman to Crystal Lake and release him into the waters, where they are confronted and threatened by Bluff. Seeing this his daughter, Beebe, sides with her friends and Mayor Dink hints at revealing Bluff's practices to the government unless he volunteers to clean up Lucky Duck Lake himself. After Patti sees Doug was right all along, she dumps Guy and Doug is about to reveal his feelings for her, but is interrupted by Herman. The gang bid goodbye to Herman and spend the rest of Valentine's night celebrating by the lake.

Voice cast
 Tom McHugh as Doug Funnie, Lincoln
 Fred Newman as Skeeter Valentine, Mr. Dink, Porkchop, Ned
 Chris Phillips as Roger Klotz, Boomer, Larry, Mr. Chiminy
 Constance Shulman as Patti Mayonnaise
 Frank Welker as Herman Melville
 Alice Playten as Beebe Bluff, Elmo (this would be her final role in an animated movie before her death in 2011)
 Guy Hadley as Guy Graham
 Doug Preis as Mr. Funnie, Mr. Bluff, Willie, Chalky, Bluff Agent
 Eddie Korbich as Al & Moo Sleech, Robocrusher
 David O'Brien as Quailman Announcer
 Doris Belack as Mayor Tippi Dink
 Becca Lish as Judy Funnie, Mrs. Funnie, Connie
 Greg Lee as Principal White
 Bob Bottone as Bluff Assistant
 Bruce Bayley Johnson as Mr. Swirly
 Fran Brill as Mrs. Elaine Perigrew
 Melissa Greenspan as Briar Langolier

Additional voice artists
 Rodger Bumpass as Green Police Officer
 Paul Eiding as Red Police Officer 
 Jackie Gonneau as Kid #1
 Sherry Lynn as Kid #2
 Mickie McGowan as Lunch Lady
 Phil Proctor as Brian the A/V Nerd
 Brianne Siddall as Kid #3
 Claudette Wells as Kid #4

Production
Nickelodeon was originally making a Doug film adaptation in 1993 when they made a deal with 20th Century Fox to make films based on their properties along with films like Rugrats and Ren & Stimpy. However, the plans evaporated when Viacom acquired Paramount Pictures in 1994, and the deal expired in the following year. Only The Rugrats Movie materialized in November 1998.

In 1996, when Disney bought Jumbo Pictures along with the cartoon, they decided to revive the project for the Doug film. This film was originally planned as a direct-to-video release under the title The First Doug Movie Ever as shown in trailers, but due to the success of The Rugrats Movie, they decided to make it a theatrical release.

This is the last American theatrical animated film to use traditional cels, in which the title sequence of the film used digital ink and paint.

Release
The film was theatrically released with the short "Opera Box", featuring Donald and Daisy Duck, from the television series Mickey Mouse Works.

Critical reception

The film garnered a 26% approval rating on Rotten Tomatoes, with 9 of a total 34 reviews being determined as positive. The critical consensus reads, "Doug's 1st Movie may entertain very young fans of its main character, but essentially amounts to a forgettable feature-length episode of his show." Critics were harsh to Doug's 1st Movie when it was released theatrically. Many noted that the film felt too much like an extended episode of the show (story and animation-wise) and many mention that the film should have stayed a direct-to-video release. Most of the criticism came from the plot, writing, and music, though they praised the animation, voice acting and ending. Screenit.com awarded the film 4 out of 10, determining that it was mediocre and did not have "that magic or cinematic feel to warrant the big screen treatment" and it felt like the regular series.

Roger Ebert gave the film 2½ out of 4 stars, quoting "Doug's 1st Movie is a thin and less than thrilling feature-length version of a Saturday morning animated series, unseen by me. Chatter on the Web suggests it was originally intended to go straight to video, but was rechanneled into theaters after the startling success of The Rugrats Movie. Since Doug originally started on Nickelodeon, where Rugrats resides, the decision made sense – or would have if this had been a better movie."

Box office
Doug's 1st Movie opened at #5 in its opening weekend with $4,470,489, for an average of $1,971 from a very wide 2,268 theaters. While this may be deemed as low for an average Hollywood film, Doug only cost $5 million to make due to its direct-to-video budget and a somewhat low-key promotional campaign. As such, the film still managed to gross $19,421,271 in ticket sales, creating a large profit for Disney and making it a box office success.

Awards and nominations
The film was nominated for a Stinker Award for Worst Achievement in Animation.

Home media
The film was released on VHS on September 21, 1999, and on DVD as a Disney Movie Club exclusive on July 20, 2012. The DVD used a TV edit, with fade-ins and fade-outs to make way for commercial breaks, as well as sped-up closing credits.

The film, along with Disney's Doug, was released on Disney+ on November 12, 2019, its first day of release. This used a new transfer of the film sourced from the master print, allowing the end credits to be seen at their intended speed.

References

External links
 Official website

Doug's 1st Movie at the TCM Movie Database
 
 
 

1999 films
1999 animated films
1990s American animated films
1990s children's comedy films
1990s English-language films
Animated films about children
Animated films based on animated series
American children's animated comedy films
DisneyToon Studios animated films
Films based on television series
Films scored by Mark Watters
Disney Television Animation films
1999 directorial debut films
1999 comedy films
Doug (TV series)
Walt Disney Pictures animated films